Sergey Felixovich Batalov is a Russian actor. Merited Artist of the Russian Federation. He appeared in over 140 films.

Biography
Sergey was born on April 19, 1957. He studied at the acting department at Russian Institute of Theatre Arts, after which he worked at the Theater on Malaya Bronnaya, as well as at the  Human  Theater and the Moscow Art Theater.

Selected filmography

References

External links 
 Sergey Batalov on kino-teatr.ru

Soviet male film actors
Russian male film actors
1957 births
Living people
Russian Academy of Theatre Arts alumni
Honored Artists of the Russian Federation
Recipients of the Nika Award
Russian male voice actors
Soviet male stage actors
Russian male stage actors